Óscar Lozano may refer to

Oscar Lozano (sports shooter) (born 1928), Mexican sports shooter
Óscar Lozano (footballer) (born 1996), Spanish footballer